The American Cheese Society (ACS) is a non-profit trade group for the American cheese industry that was founded in 1983.

ACS promotes American cheeses, provides the industry with educational resources and networking opportunities and encourages high standards of Cheesemaking with safety and sustainability. ACS issues awards for cheeses and cultured dairy products in its annual Judging & Competition. Since 1983, cheesemakers, retailers, distributors, importers/exporters, dairy farmers, academics, enthusiasts, specialty food producers, and others have attended the association's Annual Conference.

ACS was founded by Frank Kosikowski, a professor at Cornell University. Kosikowski authored several books on cheese, including Cheese and Fermented Milk Food.  During the 1980s, most of the ACS staff was volunteer.  By the 1990s, ACS had grown along with the  American cheese industry. 

In 2018 ACS had nearly 1,800 members of the association worldwide. Professional membership is those working in the industry, and Associate for non-professionals.

Objective
ACS has an alliance nonprofit organization called "the American Cheese Education Foundation (ACEF)". ACEF is a 501(c)(3) charitable organization.

Events and education
ACS holds an annual conference and competition in the United States. 

ACS also developed and administers the ACS Certified Cheese Professional Exam (ACS CCP Exam) and the ACS T.A.S.T.E. Test, which one must pass to receive the ACS Certified Cheese Sensory Evaluator credential.  An online directory of individuals with the ACS CCP designation is available for reference by organizations and individuals seeking employees. 

ACS organizes the American Cheese Month every October. The month-long event promotes the American cheese industry and increased funding for the American Cheese Education Foundation. American Cheese Month encourages cheesemakers to host special events, such as tours at their farms. People from across the country are encouraged to join by promoting cheese-related events, including gatherings of cheesemakers, retailers, cheesemongers, and chefs.

See also

 List of cheesemakers

References

American dairy organizations
Organizations based in Denver
1983 establishments in New York (state)
Food industry trade groups